Taherabad (also Romanized as Ţāherābād) is a village in Qaleh-ye Khvajeh Rural District, in the Central District of Andika County, Khuzestan Province, Iran. At the 2006 census, its population was 562, in 104 families.

References 

Populated places in Andika County